Tselinnoye is a rural locality (a selo) and the administrative center of Tselinny Selsoviet and Tselinny District, Altai Krai, Russia. The population was 4,836 in 2016. There are 56 streets.

Geography 
The village is located 170 km south-east from Barnaul.

References 

Rural localities in Tselinny District, Altai Krai